Hemileuca stonei, the pangola-grass moth or Stone's buckmoth, is an insect in the family Saturniidae. The species was first described by Claude Lemaire in 1993. It is found in Central and North America.

The MONA or Hodges number for Hemileuca stonei is 7744.5.

References

Further reading

 
 
 

Hemileucinae
Articles created by Qbugbot
Moths described in 1993